The Battle of Savo Island was part of Guadalcanal Campaign and was fought on 9 August 1942 in the waters around Savo Island by forces of the Imperial Japanese Navy (IJN) and Allies' Guadalcanal—Tulagi invasion force composed of ships from the United States Navy (USN) and Royal Australian Navy (RAN). The battle resulted in a major Allied defeat, losing four heavy cruisers. The Japanese lost no ships but failed to capitalize on the temporary strategic advantage gained from the battle, leaving the unprotected Allied transports unharmed.

Because the Japanese had the tactical initiative, their forces are listed first.

Japanese order of battle

Striking Force 
Vice Admiral Gunichi Mikawa in heavy cruiser Chokai
 8th Fleet
 1 heavy cruiser
 1 :  
 Top speed: 34.25 knots
 Main battery: 10 × 8-inch 
 Secondary btty.: 8 × 5-inch
 Anti-aircraft btty.: 8 × 25mm, 4 × 13mm 
 Torpedo tubes: 16 × 24-inch
 1 destroyer
 1 : 
 Top speed: 37.25 knots
 Main battery: 4 × 4.7-inch 
 Anti-aircraft btty.: 2 × 7.7mm 
 Torpedo tubes: 6 × 21-inch

 Cruiser Division 6
 Rear Admiral Aritomo Gotō in heavy cruiser Aoba
 4 heavy cruisers
 2 : , 
 2 : , 
 Top speed: 33 knots
 Main battery: 6 × 8-inch 
 Secondary btty.: 4 × 4.7-inch
 Anti-aircraft btty.: 8 × 25mm, 4 × 13mm 
 Torpedo tubes: 8 × 24-inch 

 Cruiser Division 18
 Rear Admiral Mitsuharu Matsuyama in light cruiser Tenryū
 2 light cruisers
 1 : 
 Top speed: 33 knots
 Main battery: 4 × 5.5-inch 
 Anti-aircraft btty.: 1 × 3-inch, 2 × 13mm 
 Torpedo tubes: 6 × 21-inch 
 1 Yūbari-class light cruiser:  
 Top speed: 35.5 knots
 Main battery: 6 × 5.5-inch 
 Anti-aircraft btty.: 1 × 3-inch, 2 × 13mm 
 Torpedo tubes: 4 × 24-inch

Allied order of battle

Task Group 62.6 
Rear Admiral Victor Crutchley (RN) in heavy cruiser Australia

Southern Force
Captain Howard D. Bode (USN) in heavy cruiser Chicago
 3 heavy cruisers
 2  / Kent-subclass:  ,  
 Top speed: 31.5 knots
 Main battery: 8 × 8-inch guns
 Secondary btty.: 8 × 4-inch
 Anti-aircraft btty.: 8 × 2-pounder, 8 × 50-cal.
 Torpedo tubes: 8 × 21-inch

 1 : 
 Top speed: 32.7 knots
 Main battery: 9 × 8-inch guns
 Secondary btty.: 8 × 5-inch/25-cal. dual-purpose
 2 destroyers
 2  destroyers: , 
 Top speed: 36.5 knots
 Main battery: 4 × 5-inch/38-cal.
 Anti-aircraft btty.: 4 × 1.1-inch
 Torpedo tubes: 16 × 21-inch

Northern Force
Captain Frederick L. Riefkohl (USN) in heavy cruiser Vincennes
 3 heavy cruisers
 Top speed: 32.7 knots
 Main battery: 9 × 8-inch guns
 Secondary btty.: 8 × 5-inch/25-cal. dual-purpose
 2 destroyers
 1 : 
 1 : 
 Top speed: 36.5 knots
 Main battery: 4 × 5-inch/38-cal.
 Anti-aircraft btty.: 4 × 1.1-inch
 Torpedo tubes: 16 × 21-inch

Notes

References

Bibliography 
 
 
 
 

Conflicts in 1942
Pacific Ocean theatre of World War II
Naval aviation operations and battles
Guadalcanal Campaign
Naval battles of World War II involving Japan
Naval battles of World War II involving the United States
August 1942 events
World War II orders of battle
United States Navy in World War II